Bernardino da Polenta may refer to:
 Bernardino da Polenta (lord of Cervia, died 1313)
 Bernardino I da Polenta, lord of Ravenna and Cervia, 1346–1359
 Bernardino II da Polenta, lord of Ravenna and Cerbie, 1389–1400, son of Guido III da Polenta